RheinEnergieStadion, formerly Müngersdorfer Stadion or Müngersdorfer Stadium, is a German football stadium in Cologne. It was built on the site of the two previous Müngersdorfer stadiums. It is the home of the local Bundesliga team, 1. FC Köln. The stadium was one of five stadiums hosting both the 2005 FIFA Confederations Cup and 2006 FIFA World Cup, and hosted the 2020 UEFA Europa League Final behind closed doors. Local energy company RheinEnergie AG currently holds the naming rights to the stadium, hence it was known as the Stadion Köln for the final.

History
Under the terms of the Treaty of Versailles (1919), the fortifications of Cologne were removed, thus allowing for the building of a new structure in the surrounding area. The new construction enabled the city to create 15,000 jobs. The new stadium was called the Müngersdorfer Stadion. This allowed Cologne not only to help stabilize the country but also to gain prestige and economic benefits for the city. The cost was tallied at 47.4 million Deutsche Mark.

Following the completion of the stadium, the city began to gain prominence in the domestic sports world. Many major football matches were held at the stadium in front of huge crowds. The first international match was held on 20 November 1927, when the Germany national team drew 2–2 with the Netherlands. Since then, the German team has played 19 times at the stadium, and only one of those matches resulted in a loss. Another notable match was the first post-war game, which saw 1. FC Nürnberg beat 1. FC Kaiserslautern 2–1, in front of a crowd of 75,000.

One of the specialties of the Müngersdorfer Stadion was the track meets for non-professional sportsmen. In 1929 there were over 38,000 participants. However, in 1933 Jews were no longer allowed to take part. After the war the stadium has only hosted professional level sports.

Recent matches of importance
In 2005, the stadium was a venue for three first-round games of the FIFA Confederations Cup, including the opening match between Argentina and Tunisia. The game was won by Argentina 2–1.

The Müngersdorfer has been host to many important UEFA Cup matches. Bayer Leverkusen played against Barcelona, and Galatasaray against Monaco in the 1988–89 European Cup. Borussia Mönchengladbach played both Arsenal and Monaco in the 1996–97 UEFA Cup. The stadium also functioned as the home ground to second-tier Alemannia Aachen in their 2004–05 UEFA Cup campaign.

Following the COVID-19 pandemic in Europe, the 2020 UEFA Europa League Final was moved from the Stadion Energa Gdańsk in Gdańsk, Poland to the RheinEnergieStadion, to be played behind closed doors. Sevilla won the match, defeating Inter Milan 3–2.

Awards
In July 2004, the RheinEnergieStadion was awarded a bronze medal for distinguished sporting and leisure facilities by the International Olympic Committee.

Renovation

There have been two renovations, from 1972 to 1975 and from 2002 to 2004.

In 1974, the World Cup was held in West Germany, and Cologne had wanted to be a host city. The city's bid was approved and it soon began work on a new stadium that was to replace the now outdated Müngersdorfer Stadion. However, the city was unable to raise the money needed for a stadium of the desired size. The original plan was for an 80,000-seat arena, which was planned to have cost 23.5 million Deutsche Mark. But the total kept growing. In the end, if the stadium had been completed, the cost would have amounted to 93.5 million. At the time, the city was able to provide only an extra 6 million Deutsche Mark.

Following the World Cup, Cologne still wanted the stadium completed. Hence, on 12 November 1975, a 61,000-seat arena was inaugurated with a match between 1. FC Köln and SC Fortuna Köln, 1. FC Köln winning 1–0. In this configuration the stadium hosted the UEFA Euro 1988.

With the news of the prospect of bringing the World Cup back to Germany, the city reacted and started renovation of the stadium, which was completed in 2003. Unlike previous configurations, there are no track-and-field facilities, allowing spectators to be much closer to the pitch than they might have been in a traditional continental multi-purpose stadium.

Facilities
The capacity is about 50,000 people during club matches and 45,965 for international games, when terracing is not allowed. The entire field is lit with a floodlight system. In the north grandstand there is a museum dedicated to 1. FC Köln.

External dimensions

2006 FIFA World Cup 
The stadium was one of the venues for the 2006 FIFA World Cup. However, due to sponsorship contracts, the arena was called "FIFA World Cup Stadium Cologne" during the World Cup.

The following games were played at the stadium during the World Cup of 2006:

Transportation 
The stadion is part of Sportpark Müngersdorf, adjacent to Aachener Straße. It is accessible by car via the Cologne Beltway, only some 1200 m off the Bundesautobahn 1.

Concerts
Queen performed at the stadium on 19 July 1986 during their European Magic Tour and on 27 May 2016 as Queen + Adam Lambert on their Summer Festival Tour.

Michael Jackson performed at the stadium three times. The first was on 3 July 1988 during the Bad Tour, the second on 11 July 1992, during the Dangerous World Tour and the third was on 3 June 1997 during the HIStory World Tour. The singer performed for over 150 000 fans at this stadium. Only Billie Jean was leaked on the internet as footage for 11 July 1992 and as an audio for 3 June 1997.

Pink Floyd played at the stadium two times. The first was on 18 June 1989 as part of their A Momentary Lapse of Reason Tour, the second was on 2 August 1994 as part of their The Division Bell Tour.

The Rolling Stones played a concert at the venue on 4–5 July 1982 on The Rolling Stones European Tour 1982. The band played with Peter Maffey and also the J. Geils Band.

American hard rock band Guns N’ Roses played at the stadium in both May 1992 and June 1993 during its two and a half year long Use Your Illusion Tour.

Tina Turner played a sold-out (60,288 / 60,288) concert at the stadium on 28 July 2000 as part of her Twenty Four Seven Tour.

Bon Jovi performed at the stadium on 20 June 2001, during the One Wild Night Tour and on 23 June 2013, as part of the Because We Can Tour.

AC/DC performed at the venue on 8 July 2001, during the Stiff Upper Lip World Tour and on 19 May 2009, as part of the Black Ice World Tour.

Robbie Williams performed the venue's last show at the old Müngersdorfer Stadion on 11 August 2001, during the Weddings, Barmitzvahs & Stadiums Tour.

The pop rock singer P!nk performed on 29 May 2010, during her Funhouse Summer Carnival.

Bruce Springsteen performed on 27 May 2012, during his Wrecking Ball World Tour in front of a sold-out crowd of 40,417 fans.

Coldplay played a concert at the stadium on 4 September 2012, as part of their Mylo Xyloto Tour.

German Rock Band Unheilig performed their final concert at the stadium on 10 September 2016.

Rihanna performed here on 28 July 2016 for her Anti World Tour.

Iron Maiden performed here on 2 July 2022 as a part of their Legacy of the Beast World Tour.

Red Hot Chili Peppers performed here on 5 July 2022 as part of their 2022 Global Stadium Tour.

References

External links

A 3-D model of the stadium
baukunst-nrw about the stadium's architecture with additional photos

1. FC Köln
2006 FIFA World Cup stadiums
2005 FIFA Confederations Cup stadiums
Football venues in Germany
Sports venues in Cologne
Multi-purpose stadiums in Germany
Gerkan, Marg and Partners buildings
UEFA Euro 1988 stadiums
UEFA Euro 2024 stadiums
1923 establishments in Germany
Sports venues completed in 1923
American football venues in Germany